David Gelston (July 4, 1744 – August 21, 1828) was an American merchant and politician.

Early life
Gelston was born on July 4, 1744, in Bridgehampton in Suffolk County on Long Island in what was then the Province of New York. He was a son of Deacon Maltby Gelston and Mary (née Jones) Gelston. His maternal grandparents were Dr. Thomas Jones and Margaret (née Livingston) Jones (a daughter of Philip Livingston).

Career
As the American Revolution approached, Gelston became politically active. He signed the Articles of Association in 1774, agreeing to avoid British imports, even though this hurt his own business. He represented Suffolk County in the New York Provincial Congress of 1775 to 1777, as well as the 1777 New York State Constitutional Convention that debated and enacted the first constitution of the State of New York. He was a Democratic-Republican and he worked closely with Aaron Burr.

He was a member from Suffolk County of the New York State Assembly from 1777 to 1785. During his last term, he was Speaker. As speaker, he took a leading role in reconciling the differences between Tory and Whig factions. He oversaw the repeal of all the laws that had imposed civil and legal penalties on Tories.

In 1787, he removed to New York City, and from 1787 to 1801, was Surrogate of New York County. In 1789, the State Assembly appointed him a delegate to the last session of the Continental Congress. He was a member of the New York State Senate from 1791 to 1794, and from 1798 to 1802.

In 1801, Gelston was appointed Collector of the Port of New York by President Thomas Jefferson, and held that post until 1821 when he retired.

Personal life
Gelston was married to Pheobe Mitchell (1753–1836). Together, they were the parents of:

 Pheobe Gelston (1771–1836), who married Nicoll Floyd, the son of William Floyd.
 Maltby Gelston (1772–1860), who was a member of the New York State Assembly and who served as president of the Bank of the Manhattan Company.

It was during 1792, that Charles Willson Peale was commissioned by Gelston, a notable American during the time, to paint a "head size" portrait of Gelston as well as a companion piece of his wife and daughter. This painting is currently displayed at the La Salle Art Museum.

Gelston died on August 21, 1828, in New York City. He was buried in the First Presbyterian Church Cemetery in New York.

References

External links

 GELSTON, David, 1744-1828, Guide to Research Collections
 

1744 births
1828 deaths
Politicians from Suffolk County, New York
Members of the New York Provincial Congress
Continental Congressmen from New York (state)
18th-century American politicians
New York (state) state senators
Speakers of the New York State Assembly
Collectors of the Port of New York
People from Bridgehampton, New York